Jafar Jabbarly is a Baku Metro station. It opened on 27 October 1993. It is named after Jafar Jabbarly.

See also
List of Baku metro stations

References

Baku Metro stations
Railway stations opened in 1993
1993 establishments in Azerbaijan